The Gletscherhorn is a mountain of the Oberhalbstein Alps, located between the valleys of Bergalga and Maroz, in the canton of Graubünden. It is situated north-west of Piz Duan.

References

External links
 Gletscherhorn on Hikr

Mountains of the Alps
Alpine three-thousanders
Mountains of Switzerland
Mountains of Graubünden
Avers
Bregaglia